The Paibian is the lowest stage of Furongian series of the Cambrian. It follows the Guzhangian (3rd series of the Cambrian) and is succeeded by the Jiangshanian Stage. The base is defined as the first appearance of the trilobite Glyptagnostus reticulatus around  million years ago. The top, or the base of the Jiangshanian is defined as the first appearance of the trilobite Agnostotes orientalis around  million years ago.

The name is derived from Paibi, a village in Hunan, China. The GSSP is defined in the "Paibi section" (Wuling Mountains, Huayuan County), an outcrop of the Huaqiao Formation(花桥组). The base is the first occurrence of Glyptagnostus reticulatus which is 396 m above the base of the Huaqiao Formation at the type locality.

References 

 
Cambrian geochronology
Geological ages